Cyperus hesperius is a sedge of the family Cyperaceae that is native to Australia.

In Western Australia it is found on rocky hillsides in the Pilbara region where it grows in red sandy-loamy soils.

The species was first described in 1991 by Karen Wilson. There are no synonyms.

See also
List of Cyperus species

References

Plants described in 1991
Flora of Western Australia
hesperius
Taxa named by Karen Louise Wilson